A Brief History of Everyone Who Ever Lived: The Stories in Our Genes (published in the United States as A Brief History of Everyone Who Ever Lived: The Human Story Retold Through Our Genes) is a popular science book by British geneticist, author and broadcaster Adam Rutherford. It was first published in 2016 in the United Kingdom by Weidenfeld & Nicolson. An updated edition was published in the United States in 2017, with a different subtitle, by The Experiment. The book is about human genetics and what it reveals about human identity and their history.

A Brief History of Everyone Who Ever Lived won gold at the 2017 Foreword INDIE Book Awards for Science, and won the 2018 Thomas Bonner Book Prize. The book was also a 2017 National Book Critics Circle Award non-fiction finalist, featured on the 2017 Wellcome Book Prize longlist, and appeared on National Geographic's top 12 books from 2017.

Table of contents
Foreword by Siddhartha Mukherjee [*]
Introduction
Part One: How we came to be
Horny and mobile
The first European union
These American lands [*]
When we were kingsThe king lives onRichard III, Act VIThe king is dead ...
Part Two: Who we are now
The end of race
The most wonderous map ever produced by humankind
Fate
A short introduction to the future of humankind
Epilogue

[*] 2017 US edition

Synopsis
A Brief History of Everyone Who Ever Lived explains the Out of Africa hypothesis that Homo sapiens originated in Africa about 200,000 years ago. They began slowly migrating to Europe around 100,000 years ago, where they encountered Neanderthals. DNA extracted from Neanderthal remains and compared to contemporary human DNA showed that Homo sapiens mated with Homo neanderthalensis. Today, about 2% of the sequence in European genomes is of Neanderthal origin. The book also investigates the lineage of European kings. DNA has enabled geneticists to construct their family trees going back to Charlemagne in the 8th century. Rutherford shows that family trees are not neat and tidy, but tangled webs. They often collapse in on themselves as a result of inbreeding. King Charles II's family tree was particularly bad as a result of incest in the family. Their rational for this practice was to preserve their "royal blood", and this often had an adverse effect on their health; Charles himself was disabled, epileptic and mentally unstable.

The book discusses the genes responsible for some human traits, including red hair, earwax and lactose intolerance/lactase persistence. Racial classification is shown to be a scientifically invalid concept. The genome encodes a huge number of characteristics that differ from person to person, which far outnumber the physical differences between black and white people. Rutherford concludes that genetics cannot be used to define race. Francis Galton and his contribution to the development of eugenics is also examined. The Human Genome Project revealed that humans only have about 20,000 genes, far fewer than scientists expected, and ended up posing more questions than it answered. The project also highlighted the limits of genetics and that it is no panacea for diseases. Rutherford criticises the popular press for their inaccurate reporting on genetics, and companies conducting DNA ancestry tests that produce impossibly accurate results. He says these companies and the press often overlook the fact that genetics is not an exact science – it is probabilistic.

Reception
In a review in The Guardian, Colin Grant described A Brief History of Everyone Who Ever Lived as an "effervescent work, brimming with tales and confounding ideas". He called the author "an enthusiastic guide" who disentangles the maze of collapsed family trees and inbreeding. Grant felt that he was "especially illuminating" on the ill-defined notion of race, and "how it both does and doesn't exist". He said that Rutherford aims high: the rewriting human history, but called him "a commendable historian ... who is determined to illuminate the commonality of Homo sapiens".

Robin McKie described Rutherford's exposition of the Human Genome Project as "elegant". Writing in another review of the book in The Guardian, McKie noted how the author is careful to bring the project's "dreams of a medical revolution" down to earth, emphasising that its "greatest achievement ... was working out exactly how little we knew." McKie praised Rutherford for highlighting modern genetics' limitations, that it is better at describing humans as a species than as individuals. He called the book "a polished, thoroughly entertaining history of Homo sapiens", adding that it is "popular science writing at its best".

In a review in The New York Times, Misha Angrist described A Brief History of Everyone Who Ever Lived as "nothing less than a tour de force". Despite the book's ambitious tile, he felt that Rutherford "deliver[s] on its great promise". Angrist complimented the author on his "captivating storytelling" that is "entertaining and engaging" and "never feels pedantic". He was impressed by the way Rutherford dealt with such sensitive topics as race and eugenics, and that he used examples like earwax and lactose intolerance, rather than Mendel's exhumed pea plants to demonstrate how genetics work. Angrist concluded his review by stating: "If genetics can ever offer us words to live by, I reckon these are probably the best it can do."

Nancy R. Curtis wrote in the Library Journal that A Brief History of Everyone Who Ever Lived should attract readers of both popular and technical science books. She said it is "amusing and provocative", and "may bruise the egos of a few genealogists". Curtis did, however, complain that Rutherford gives too much attention to European and British issues, and from time to time "succumbs to editorializing on peripheral topics", for example creationism and genetic determinism. In a review in The Wall Street Journal, Charles C. Mann was a little critical of the book's title, saying that it "is not particularly brief, not exactly a history and not concerned with everyone who ever lived". But he was pleased that Rutherford did not fall into the trap of "hyping the science to sell the story" that popular science books often do. He said the author is "an enthusiastic guide and a good story-teller", although Mann did complain about Rutherford's many digressions that interrupt the flow of the text.

Awards

Notes

References

External links

A Brief History of Everyone Who Ever Lived: The Stories in Our Genes at Weidenfeld & Nicolson
A Brief History of Everyone Who Ever Lived: The Human Story Retold Through Our Genes at The Experiment

2016 non-fiction books
Genetics books
Popular science books
Weidenfeld & Nicolson books